The 1974 Cork Intermediate Football Championship was the 39th staging of the Cork Intermediate Football Championship since its establishment by the Cork County Board in 1909. The draw for the opening round fixtures took place on 27 January 1974. 

The final was played on 29 September 1974 at the Cloughduv GAA Grounds, between Bishopstown and Newcestown, in what was their first ever meeting in the final. Bishopstown won the match by 1-10 to 1-06 to claim their first ever championship title.

Results

Final

References

Cork Intermediate Football Championship